Louis Charles Gillis Sr. (August 8, 1924 – February 3, 2005), nicknamed "Sea Boy", was an American Negro league catcher from 1946 to 1952.

A native of Birmingham, Alabama, Gillis graduated from A. H. Parker High School, and served in the US Marine Corps in World War II. He broke into the Negro leagues in 1946 with the Atlanta Black Crackers, and later played for the Birmingham Black Barons.  Gillis died in Birmingham in 2005 at age 80.

References

External links
 Louis Gillis at Negro Leagues Baseball Museum

1924 births
2005 deaths
Atlanta Black Crackers players
Birmingham Black Barons players
Baseball catchers
Baseball players from Birmingham, Alabama
20th-century African-American sportspeople
21st-century African-American people